Peer Mohammed Hussain Soharvardi (born 12 April 1941) better known as Sher–e–Kuthar among his followers is a Kashmiri politician and former Minister of State in the erstwhile state of Jammu and Kashmir. He served as Member of Legislative Assembly (2002-2008) after being elected from  the Shangus assembly constituency. He, subsequently, also served as Vice Chairman of the J&K Muslim Wakf Board.

Personal life

Family
Hussain was born on 12 April 1942 in Kadapora, Anantnag to Haajra Begum and Peer Salam-ud-din Soharvardi. He is a descendent of the famous Soharvardi clan, a family of prominent Sufi Saints and Hakeems. He has four children. One of his daughters, Sameena Hussain, currently serves as District Development Council Member from Achabal Block on the mandate of People's Alliance for Gupkar Declaration. One of his sons, Advocate Hashim Hussain Soharvardi, is the former Additional Advocate General of J&K and a prominent youth leader of Jammu and Kashmir National Conference. His son-in-law Peerzada Mansoor Hussain is also former member Legislative Assembly from Shangus, Anantnag (2008-2014).

Education
He did his early schooling from Govt. Higher Secondary School, Anantnag. He did B.Sc. Agriculture from Birsa Agricultural University in Ranchi.

Government service
He also served as a Civil Servant. He has been designated as ACD Anantnag, Director Rural Development Department and District Magistrate in various parts of the Chenab Valley including various other posts as well. After retirement he joined Mufti Mohammed Sayeed to form the Jammu and Kashmir People's Democratic Party.

Political career

Pre 1999
Peer Mohd. Hussain was long before his retirement affiliated to politics. He was one of the closest aids of Mirza Afzal Beg.

1999-2008
In 1999, Mufti Mohammed Sayeed, Tariq Hameed Karra, Ghulam Hassan Mir and Hussain formed the Jammu and Kashmir People's Democratic Party. He played a huge role in introducing the party to the Chenab Valley where he was quite influential. He was instrumental in popularizing the party in South Kashmir. He was also a part of the general council of the Jammu and Kashmir People's Democratic Party. He contested in the 2002 Jammu and Kashmir Legislative Assembly election from Shangus in District Anantnag on the mandate of Jammu and Kashmir People's Democratic Party and comfortably won the seat defeating the runner up Gulzar Ahmad Wani of Indian National Congress. In the coalition government of Jammu and Kashmir People's Democratic Party and Indian National Congress when Ghulam Nabi Azad was the Chief Minister of Jammu and Kashmir Hussain was appointed Minister of State of Jammu and Kashmir. He was given the portfolios of PDD, Health, Fisheries and Higher Education. He served as Minister of State until 2008.

2009-present
In 2009, he contested the 2009 Indian general election from Anantnag (Lok Sabha constituency) on the mandate of Jammu and Kashmir People's Democratic Party in which he lost to Jammu and Kashmir National Conference candidate Mirza Mehboob Beg by a rather slim margin. On, 23 March 2015 he was appointed Vice Chairman of Jammu and Kashmir Muslim Wakf Board by CM Mufti Mohammed Sayeed. After the death of Mufti Mohammed Sayeed, Mehbooba Mufti was sworn in as Chief Minister of Jammu and Kashmir.  Hussain started maintaining distance from the party as he was not satisfied with the leadership's treatment of senior leader's and he was also not in favour of the Jammu and Kashmir People's Democratic Party and Bharatiya Janata Party coalition government. He claimed that Mehbooba Mufti was cornered by stooges who were leading her to the wrong way, he claimed that they were harming the party's reputation on the ground level. In November 2017, he resigned from the post VC Wakf Board and the Jammu and Kashmir People's Democratic Party.

On 19 Dec 2018, he joined Jammu and Kashmir National Conference at the residence of Farooq Abdullah amidst thousands of his supporters leaving Jammu and Kashmir People's Democratic Party where he was a co-founder.

References 

Jammu and Kashmir MLAs 2002–2008
Jammu and Kashmir Peoples Democratic Party politicians
Jammu & Kashmir National Conference politicians
State cabinet ministers of Jammu and Kashmir
Kashmiri people
Indian people of Kashmiri descent
People from Jammu and Kashmir
People from Anantnag district
21st-century Indian Muslims
1941 births
Living people
21st-century Indian politicians
Jammu and Kashmir politicians